Fria Airport  is an airport serving Fria, a town and prefecture in the Boke Region of the Republic of Guinea. The airport is on the southeast side of Fria.

See also

Transport in Guinea
List of airports in Guinea

References

External links
 OpenStreetMap - Fria Airport
SkyVector - Fria/Katourou Airport
OurAirports - Fria Airport
FallingRain - Fria Airport

Airports in Guinea
Kindia Region